Treves (Trier) is a city in Germany on the banks of the Moselle.

Treves may also refer to:

 Giorgio Treves de'Bonfili (1884–1964), Italian footballer
 Treves (surname), a surname (and a list of people with the name)

See also
 Trèves